Genoplesium alticola, commonly known as the tableland midge orchid, is a small terrestrial orchid endemic to Queensland. It has a single thin leaf fused to the flowering stem and up to twenty five small, hairy, dark purplish-red and green flowers.

Description
The edges of the dorsal sepal have short, dark hairs. There is an oblong callus in the centre of the labellum and covering about half of its surface. Flowering occurs between December and February.

Taxonomy and naming
Genoplesium alticola was first formally described in 1991 by David Jones from a specimen collected near Danbulla and the description was published in Australian Orchid Research. The specific epithet (alticola) is derived from the Latin words altus meaning "high"  and cola meaning "dweller", referring to the plant's relatively high altitude habitat.

Distribution and habitat
Genoplesium alticola grows in sparse forest, often in grass tussocks on ridges on higher places. It is only known from the Atherton Tableland near Heberton and on Walshs Pyramid.

References

External links
 

alticola
Endemic orchids of Australia
Orchids of Queensland
Plants described in 1991